Bermudians Against the Draft (B.A.D.) was a joint action group established in the British Overseas Territory of Bermuda to challenge the legality of conscription based on principles of natural justice and judicial review.

B.A.D. was formed in 2006 in response to mounting evidence that military officials in the Bermuda Defence Department and the Bermuda Regiment systematically abused their statutory powers of recruitment, mobilization and enforcement of its internal security obligations to the British Crown.

B.A.D. has defined a unique moment in the global conscientious objector movement by enabling philosophical or political dissent to the draft to become a sufficient grounds for deferral of military service.

This civil disobedience strategy was driven by the 2% doctrine espoused by renowned pacifist, Albert Einstein, who claimed that:

 'In countries where conscription exists, the true pacifist must refuse military duty. In countries where compulsory military service does not exist, true pacifists must publicly declare that they will not take up arms in any circumstances.... The timid may say, "What's the use? We'll be sent to prison." To them I say: even if only two per cent announced their refusal to fight, governments would be powerless - they would not dare send such a huge number to prison.' (Albert Einstein, 1930)

In accordance with this concept, B.A.D. has effectively organised some 14 complainants out of a total battalion of approximately 530 infantry conscripts to be deferred from military service, pending the outcome of a civil case questioning the legitimacy of conscription within the only land force under the British Crown to continue the draft.

B.A.D. gained support from British Member of Parliament Andrew MacKinlay for Thurrock who, in his capacity as a Government Backbencher who sits on the Foreign Affairs Committee, has challenged the British Government to justify its support for Bermuda's conscription regime.

The Supreme Court case that will adjudicate the legality of conscription is scheduled to commence on February 25, 2008 and will herald an unprecedented investigation of the traditionally conservative relationship between the United Kingdom and Bermuda, its oldest and most populated remaining colony.

In 2010 a ruling by the Privy Council in the UK went against the case of B.A.D. and upheld the laws of conscription in Bermuda.

In 2018, conscription was finally ended through the Defence Amendment Act.

References

External links 
  Bermudians Against the Draft
 Written Submission by Rev. Larry Marshall Sr. (co-founder of B.A.D.) to the UK Foreign & Commonwealth Office
 Royal Gazette article:  Battle against the draft
 Royal Gazette article: Conscription gets its day in court
 Attorney Blog: A 21st century form of slavery
 Disloyal Opposition (Anti-draft Blog by JD Tuccile): 21st Century Slavery

Conscientious objectors
Organisations based in Bermuda
2006 establishments in Bermuda
Organizations established in 2006